Ryan Bailey may refer to:
Ryan Bailey (sprinter) (born 1989), American sprinter
Ryan Bailey (cricketer) (born 1982), South African cricketer
Ryan Bailey (rugby league) (born 1983), English rugby league footballer
Ryan Bailey (water polo) (born 1975), American water polo player
Ryan C. Bailey, American chemist

See also
 Ryan Bailie (born 1990), Australian triathlete
 Ryan Bayley (born 1982), Australian cyclist